Hodgesia bailyi is a species of zoophilic mosquito belonging to the genus Hodgesia. It is found in Sri Lanka, India, Cambodia, Thailand, and Vietnam.

References

External links
Hodgesia Theobald, 1904 - Mosquito Taxonomic Inventory

bailyi